Skratten is a Swedish island belonging to the Haparanda archipelago. The island is located southeast of Vasikkasaari. It has no shore connection and has no buildings.

References 

Islands of Sweden